Paolo "Paul" Vincenzo Trimboli (born 25 February 1969) is a former Australian international football (soccer) player. Trimboli is of Italian ancestry and attended Xavier College, where he was a member of the First XI, and was captained by his brother.

Club career

South Melbourne FC 
Signed as a 19-year old from Sunshine George Cross, Trimboli would show right away why he was considered one of Australia's brightest talents.

Primarily playing behind the striker, Trimboli would begin to terrorise opposition defences with his skills and football knowledge. In his first 2 season at the club, Trimboli would capture the Sam Papasavas medal back-to-back for the best U/21 player in the NSL and the Theo Marmaras medal for South Melbourne's player of the season in 1988,1989 and 1990. Additionally, he would taste his first silverware with the club winning the Dockerty Cup in 1988 and 1989. 

In 1990/91 Trimboli would lead South to their first second NSL Championship by providing the all important assist for the equaliser to Joe Palatsides in the last minute against Melbourne Knights. 

Trimboli continued to dominate and was rewarded with the Johnny Warren Medal in 1992/93 for the best player in the NSL. He would continue his stronghold over the Theo Marmaras medal by winning it between 1996-1998.

In 1997/1998, Trimboli would captain the all-conquering Ange Postecoglou-led South Melbourne side to the Championship with a 2-1 win over Carlton in the Grand Final whilst claiming his second Johnny Warren medal. Trimboli would repeat the championship heroics in 1998/1999 by contributing a goal in South Melbourne's 3-2 win in the Grand Final over Sydney United. 

  

This win led South Melbourne to competing in the 1999 Oceania Champions Cup to determine the best side in Oceania. Trimboli would Captain South Melbourne to the title which qualified them for the 2000 Club World Cup.

Trimboli led the Hellas players in the tournament against footballing giants Manchester United, Necaxa and Vasco De Gama. Trimboli garnered praise for his performances against the likes of Roy Keane and Romario in the tournament. Trimboli would once again find himself captaining South Melbourne to a grand final in 2001 as they would lose to Wollongong 2-1. Trimboli would play for South until the demise of the NSL in 2004 and ultimately retire prior to the start of the A-League.

Trimboli is widely considered to be South Melbourne's greatest ever player by fans and critics alike. He was voted as captain of the South Melbourne team of the century in 2002. He is still South Melbourne's all-time record goalscorer (115), record games holder (430) and most decorated player in terms of individual accolades and silverware won.

International career
He earned 48 caps (39 'A' games) with the Socceroos, marking his debut in 1988 against Fiji with a goal. His last international came in 2002 against Tahiti. Trimboli would score 16 goals for the green and gold.

After retirement

On 21 June 2011, he was appointed General Manager of Football at A-League club Brisbane Roar.

On 25 June 2012, Trimboli reunited with Ange Postecoglou to join Melbourne Victory as Football Operations Manager.

Honours 
With Australia:
 FIFA Confederations Cup: 1997 (Runners-Up)
 OFC Nations Cup: 1996
With South Melbourne FC:
 NSL Championship: 1990-1991, 1997–1998, 1998–1999
 NSL Premiers: 1992/1993, 1997/1998, 2000/2001
OFC Champions League 1999
Dockerty Cup 1988,1989,1991,1993,1995
NSL Cup 1990, 1996
Personal honours:
 Johnny Warren Medal: 1992-1993, 1997–1998
 NSL Papasavas Medal (U-21): 1988, 1989
South Melbourne FC All-time Top Goalscorer
South Melbourne FC All-time Club Appearances
South Melbourne Team of the Century
South Melbourne Hall of Fame

Notes

External links
 Oz Football profile

1969 births
Living people
Soccer players from Melbourne
Australian people of Italian descent
Australia international soccer players
National Soccer League (Australia) players
South Melbourne FC players
Association football commentators
Caroline Springs George Cross FC players
People educated at Xavier College
Australian Institute of Sport soccer players
1996 OFC Nations Cup players
1997 FIFA Confederations Cup players
1998 OFC Nations Cup players
2002 OFC Nations Cup players
Association football forwards
Melbourne Victory FC directors of football
Australian soccer players